Arjuna Vishada Yoga (Sanskrit:- अर्जुनविषाडयोग) or "The sorrow of Arjuna" is the first of the eighteen chapters of Bhagvad Gita. The chapter has total 47 shlokas. The chapter is the 23rd chapter of Bhishma Parva, the sixth Parva of Mahabharata. 

Chapter starts from the conversation of blind king Dhritrashtra and his charioteer Sanjaya, who was narrating Kurukshetra war to him. Dhritrashtra asked about what Pandavas and Kaurvas are doing on the battlefield. Sanjay tells Dhritrashtra that everyone is ready for war. Duryodhana, the eldest Kaurva went to Dronacharya and tells about the soldiers of both the Pandava and Kaurva armies.

After the dialogues of Duryodhana, Pitamah Bhishma, Lord Krishna, Pandavas and Kaurvas all blow their conches. Then, Arjuna asked Lord Krishna, his charioteer to move the chariot in the center of battlefield as he want to see both the armies. After seeing both the armies, Arjuna's mind was engulfed with grief which is termed here as 'Vishad. He told Lord Krishna that he won't fight as his enemies were his own brothers, uncles and grandfathers. Then, Lord Krishna starts narrating Bhagvad Gita to him and motivated him for war.

 Etymology 
The chapter's name is formed with three words - first, Arjun which is referred to Arjuna only. The second word is Vishad which means sorrow or grief. The third word is Yog which means event.

 Contents 

 1. Shloka 1 - 11: Statement of the calculation and strength of the main knights of both the armies

 2. Shloka 12 - 19: the sound of the conchshells of both the armies

 3. Shloka 20 - 27: the event of inspection of armies by Arjuna.

 4. Shloka 28 - 47': Cowardice, affection and sorrowful words of Arjuna overwhelmed by infatuation

Quotes

See also 
 Lord Krishna 
 Arjuna
 Bhagvad Geeta

References 

Bhagavad Gita
Mythology